Trachycorystes is a genus of driftwood catfishes found in tropical South America.

Species 
There are currently four described species in this genus:
 Trachycorystes cratensis A. Miranda-Ribeiro, 1937
 Trachycorystes menezesi Britski & Akama, 2011
 Trachycorystes porosus C. H. Eigenmann & R. S. Eigenmann, 1888
 Trachycorystes trachycorystes (Valenciennes, 1840) (Black catfish)

References

Auchenipteridae
Fish of South America
Catfish genera
Taxa named by Pieter Bleeker